Pasi Salonen (born December 18, 1985 in Helsinki) is a Finnish former professional ice hockey forward who played extensively in the Liiga. He was selected by the Washington Capitals in the fifth-round, 138th overall, of the 2004 NHL Entry Draft.

Career statistics

Regular season and playoffs

International

References

External links

Living people
1985 births
Finnish ice hockey forwards
Ice hockey people from Helsinki
Ässät players
Beibarys Atyrau players
HC Keski-Uusimaa players
HIFK (ice hockey) players
HPK players
HSC Csíkszereda players
Hull Pirates players
Ilves players
KooKoo players
Washington Capitals draft picks
Finnish expatriate ice hockey players in England
Finnish expatriate ice hockey players in Romania
Finnish expatriate ice hockey players in Kazakhstan